Hoʻolauleʻa is a Hawaiian celebration or festival. A Hoʻolauleʻa may consist of authentic hula dancing and music, foods, vendors and games.

References 

Celebrations in Hawaii